Omobranchus punctatus, the muzzled blenny or the spotted oyster blenny is a species of combtooth blenny found in coral reefs in the Pacific and Indian ocean.  This species can reach a length of  SL.

References

punctatus
Taxa named by Achille Valenciennes
Fish described in 1836